Greenville is the name of some places in the U.S. state of New York:

 Greenville, Orange County, New York
 Greenville, Westchester County, New York
 Greenville (town), New York, in Greene County
 Greenville (CDP), New York, in the center of that town
 Greenville, New York: fictional town in What Mad Universe